Valdecir Ribeiro da Silva (born 27 October 1973), commonly known as Pingo, is a Brazilian former footballer. In his playing days he was a defensive midfielder for several professional clubs in Brazil and Portugal.

In June 2002 he signed for Campeonato Brasileiro Série A club Esporte Clube Bahia. His daughter Andreia Norton is a footballer for the Portugal women's national football team.

References

External links

1973 births
Living people
Sportspeople from Rio de Janeiro (state)
Brazilian footballers
Association football midfielders
Campeonato Brasileiro Série A players
Campeonato Brasileiro Série B players
Campeonato Brasileiro Série C players
Brazilian expatriate footballers
Expatriate footballers in Portugal
Brazilian expatriate sportspeople in Portugal
S.C.U. Torreense players
A.D. Ovarense players
União Montemor players
Serrano Football Club players
Fluminense de Feira Futebol Clube players
Esporte Clube Bahia players
Grêmio de Esportes Maringá players
Duque de Caxias Futebol Clube players
Estrela do Norte Futebol Clube players
Liga Portugal 2 players